Ömer the Tourist in Star Trek is a 1973 Turkish cult comedy/drama science fiction film, produced and directed by Hulki Saner, featuring Sadri Alışık as a Turkish hobo who is beamed aboard the Starship Enterprise.

Background
The film, which is the eighth and final in a series of films featuring Alışık as Ömer the Tourist, is commonly known as Turkish Star Trek because of plot and stylistic elements lifted from several Star Trek: The Original Series episodes.  The plot and dialogue are almost verbatim from "The Man Trap", with borrowings from "What Are Little Girls Made Of?" and "I, Mudd" (a collection of androids), "Arena" (Kirk battles a Gorn-like creature), and "Amok Time" (Kirk and Spak are forced to fight each other), as well as the unauthorized use of special effects footage from the series. Although unofficial and part of another franchise, it is the first movie taking place in Star Trek universe, filmed six years before the official motion picture.

Plot 
(character names and spellings taken from the film's credits)
The Enterprise visits planet M-113, where Doktor McCoy's old girlfriend Nancy, and her husband Profesor Crater, harbor a secret.  "Nancy" is really a shapeshifting creature who kills for salt.  When Nancy kills several crewmen, Profesor Crater pulls Ömer, on the point of being forced into a shotgun wedding, from his time zone, reasoning that Kaptan Kirk and Mr. Spak will blame him for the murders of the crewmen.  Ömer beams aboard the Enterprise, creating havoc, especially irritating Mr. Spak.  During the course of the movie, Kirk battles androids, a Gorn-like creature and even Mr. Spak, after Nancy assumes the shape of Ti-Pau, a Vulcan.  The creature is defeated by Kirk, Spak and McCoy, and Ömer returns to his shotgun wedding.

Complete Cast
Per film billing order, and with spellings taken from the credits:
Sadri Alışık as Ömer
Erol Amaç as Mr. Spak
Cemil Şahbaz as Kaptan Kirk
Ferdi Merter as Doktor McCoy
Kayhan Yıldızoğlu as Profesör Crater
Elif Pektaş as Jenice
Şule Tınaz as Nancy Crater
Oytun Şenal as Green
Füsun Olgaç as Uhura
Nevhilal as Mary
Necip Koçak as Darnell
Nermin Altınses as Ti-Pau
Yılmaz Şahin as Scoty
Nuri Uğur as Sulu
Yılmaz Suiller as Zenci
Neslihan Özgür as Tayfa
Sönmez Yıkılmaz as Herkül
Yadigar Kırmızıgül as Canavar
Kazım Oğuz as Joe

Filming

The planet-side scenes were filmed in the ruins of Ephesus.

See also
 1973 in film

References

External links
 
 https://www.somethingawful.com/movie-reviews/turist-omer-star/1/ Something Awful Review
https://www.youtube.com/watch?v=vQJcqUZDFPU Restored Version of the Film

1970s parody films
1970s science fiction comedy films
Films shot in Istanbul
Films shot in İzmir
Parody films based on Star Trek
Turkish science fiction films
Films based on works by George Clayton Johnson
Turkish sequel films
Science fiction crossover films
1973 comedy films
1973 films